This is a list of the heritage sites in Richmond, Northern Cape as recognized by the South African Heritage Resource Agency.

|}

Richmond
Heritage sites in Richmond
Tourist attractions in the Northern Cape